Take My Head is the second studio album by the London-based band Archive. This album is a collaboration of Danny Griffiths and Darius Keeler together with singer Suzanne Wooder.

Track listing 
 "You Make Me Feel" – 4:06
 "The Way You Love Me" – 3:33
 "Brother" – 3:44
 "Well Known Sinner" – 4:23
 "The Pain Gets Worse" – 4:34
 "Woman" – 3:39
 "Cloud in the Sky" – 4:41
 "Take My Head" – 4:39
 "Love in Summer" – 4:58
 "Rest My Head on You" – 3:56
 "Home" – 2:00 (hidden track)

The album contains a hidden track, which begins one minute after the end of "Rest My Head on You".

Commentaries 
There is also a limited edition of this album, which contains 2 remixes of the first track, "You Make Me Feel".
This album is the only one that features Suzanne Wooder as singer of the band.
"You Make Me Feel" was chosen for the Garnier Olia advert in 2012.

1999 albums
Archive (band) albums
Independiente Records albums